Disclose were a Japanese punk rock band from Kōchi City, heavily influenced by Discharge. Their sound heavily replicates Discharge's style, with an increased use of fuzz and distortion guitar effects. The subject matter is also similar to Discharge, in that the songs' themes are primarily about nuclear war, and its horrific consequences. On 5 June 2007, Disclose frontman Kawakami died from an overdose of alcohol and sedatives.

Former members
Tsukasa (vocals)
Kawakami (vocals, lead guitar)
Fukugawa (bass guitar)
Yasuoka (bass guitar)
Will (bass guitar)
Yuusei (bass guitar)
Gori (bass guitar)
Abe (bass guitar, US tour)
Masa (bass guitar)
Hiro the Aggression (drums and bass sometimes)
Fujiwara (drums)
Uo-Katsu (drums)
Doi (drums)
Aki (drums)
Naoto (?)
Joe (?)

Discography

LPs
 Tragedy (1994)
 Yesterday’s fairytale, tomorrow’s nightmare (1/6/2003)
 The Demos Album (1995)
 No More Pain

12"
Nightmare or Reality (May/June 1999)

Split 12"
Split 12" with Totalitär (2000)

10"es
 Great Swedish Feast (1995)
 The Aspects of War (1997)
 Nuclear Hell (with G.A.T.E.S., 2005)

7"es
 Once the War Started (1993)
 Visions of War (1996)
 4 track EP (1997)
 The Nuclear Victims (1998)
 A Mass of Raw Sound Assault (2001)
 Apocalypse of Death (March 2002)
 Neverending War (2003)
 The Sound of Disaster (2003)
 Apocalypse Continues (2004) Overthrow Records

Split 7"es
 Kochi-City Hardcore (with Insane Youth, 1993)
 Why must we die? (with Hellkrusher. 1994)
 No More Pain! (with Selfish, 1994)
 (unknown) (with Warcollapse, 1995)
 War of aggression (with Cluster Bomb Unit, 1995)
 Attack The Enemy (with Homomillita, 1995)
 Endless War (with Squandered, 1998)
 Chainsaw Tour '04 (with Framtid, 2004)
 Noise Not Music (with No Fucker, 2004)
 Split 7" with Hakuchi (2004)
 Dis-Nightmare still continues (with World Burns to Death, 2004)
 Split 7" with Besthöven (2005)
 In Chaos We Trust (with FlyBlown, 2005)
 Controlled By Fear (with Cruelty, 2005)
 Split 7" with Scarred For Life, (2007)

Demos
 Crime (1992)
 Conquest (1993)
 Fear of the War (1993)
 Total Dis-Lickers (1998)

Tapes
 The aspect of war (1997)
 Sound of disaster (?)
 The best of Disclose 1993-2001 (2006)

CompilationsRaw Brutal Assault Vol. 1 (2003, has tracks from 1992–1994)Raw Brutal Assault Vol. 2'' (2003, has tracks from 1994–1998)

References

Japanese crust and d-beat groups
Musical groups from Kōchi Prefecture